Tufo–Pardus Prostějov is a UCI Continental team founded in 2013 and based in the Czech Republic. It participates in UCI Continental Circuits races.

Team roster

References

External links

UCI Continental Teams (Europe)
Cycling teams based in the Czech Republic
Cycling teams established in 2013